Comeglians (Sappada ) is a comune (municipality) in the Province of Udine in the Italian region Friuli-Venezia Giulia, located about  northwest of Trieste and about  northwest of Udine.

Comeglians borders the following municipalities: Ovaro, Paluzza, Prato Carnico, Ravascletto, Rigolato.

Demographic evolution

References

Cities and towns in Friuli-Venezia Giulia